Reyna may refer to:

Rinə, a village in Azerbaijan
Estadio Víctor Manuel Reyna, Mexican football stadium
Spanish ship Reyna (1743), Spanish warship
Reyna (musical group), a Milwaukee-based pop duo

Given name
Reyna Gallegos, Mexican wrestler
Reyna Grande, Mexican-American author
Reyna Thompson, American football player

Surname
Agustín Zaragoza Reyna, Mexican boxer
Aida Reyna (born 1950), Peruvian volleyball player
Ángel Reyna, Mexican footballer
Antonio Roldán Reyna, Mexican boxer
Carola Reyna, Argentine actress
Casiodoro de Reyna, Spanish monk
Claudio Reyna, American soccer player
Cornelio Reyna, Mexican singer
Diana Reyna, American politician
Francisco de Reyna, Spanish painter
Fredy Reyna, Venezuelan musician
Giovanni Reyna, American soccer player
Irving Reyna, Honduran footballer
Jimmie V. Reyna, Judge on the United States Court of Appeals for the Federal Circuit
Jorge Reyna, Cuban triple jumper
Leonel Antonio Fernández Reyna, Dominican politician
Luis Reyna, Peruvian footballer
Pedro Antonio Ríos Reyna, Venezuelan musician
Valerie F. Reyna, American psychologist
Yordy Reyna, Peruvian footballer

Fictional Characters
Reyna Avila Ramirez-Arellano, a character in Percy Jackson & the Olympians, Heroes of Olympus, and Trials of Apollo by Rick Riordan
Reyna, a character in the video game Valorant

See also
Reina (disambiguation)
Rena (disambiguation)